Abdallah Khlaikhal (born ) is an Israeli footballer who plays as a forward for Hapoel Ashdod.

Career
Khlaikhal was born in 'Akbara neighborhood in Safed.

Khlaikhal made his professional debut for Ironi Kiryat Shmona in the Israeli Premier League on 28 December 2019, in the home match against Maccabi Haifa, which finished as a 1–2 loss, then he also scored his debut goal.

References

External links
 

2001 births
Living people
Israeli footballers
Arab-Israeli footballers
Hapoel Ironi Kiryat Shmona F.C. players
Al-Nasr SC (Dubai) players
Hapoel Nof HaGalil F.C. players
F.C. Kafr Qasim players
Hapoel Ashdod F.C. players
Israeli Premier League players
UAE Pro League players
Liga Leumit players
Israel youth international footballers
Association football forwards
People from Safed
Israeli expatriate footballers
Expatriate footballers in the United Arab Emirates
Israeli expatriate sportspeople in the United Arab Emirates